Siliqua is a genus of saltwater razor clams, marine bivalve molluscs in the family Pharidae, the razor clams and jackknife clams.

Species
Species in the genus Siliqua include:

 Siliqua albida (Adams & Reeve, 1850)
 Siliqua alta (Broderip & Sowerby, 1829) – northern or Arctic razor clam
 Siliqua barnardi M. Huber, 2010
 Siliqua costata (Say, 1822) – Atlantic razor clam
 Siliqua fasciata (Spengler, 1794)
 Siliqua grayana (Dunker, 1862)
 Siliqua herberti M. Huber, 2015
 Siliqua japonica Dunker, 1861
 Siliqua lucida (Conrad, 1837)
 Siliqua minima (Gmelin, 1791)
 Siliqua patula Dixon, 1789 - Pacific razor clam 
 Siliqua polita (W. Wood, 1828)
 Siliqua pulchella Dunker, 1852
 Siliqua radiata (Linnaeus, 1758)
 Siliqua rostrata (Dunker, 1862)
 Siliqua squama (Blainville, 1827)

References

External links
 Razor & jackknife clams

Bivalve genera
Pharidae